is a Japanese manga artist. She won the 49th Shogakukan Manga Award for shōjo manga for Lovely Complex  Love Com, a romance manga about a tall high school girl who falls in love with a short guy.

Works
 Haru to Kuuki Nichiyobi (1995)
 Benkyou Shinasai! (1997) – 2 volumes
 Seishun no Tamago (1997)
 Love! Love! Love! (1998–99) – 3 volumes
 Ringo Nikki (2000) – 2 volumes
 Hanada (2001) – 2 volumes
 Love Com (Bessatsu Margaret, 2001–07) – 17 volumes
 Love Com D (Deluxe Margaret, 2009)
 Love Com Two (2012)
 Himitsu Kichi (2004)
 Bokura no Ibasho (2007)
 Tokimeki Gakuen Oujigumi (2008)
 Nanaco Robin (Bessatsu Margaret, 2008–09) – 3 volumes
 Junjou Drop (2012) – 1 volume
 Berry Dynamite (Bessatsu Margaret, 2009–10) – 3 volumes
 Saredo Itoshii Hibi (2013) – 1 volume
 Dame na Watashi ni Koishite Kudasai (Monthly You, 2013–16) – 10 volumes
 Dame na Watashi ni Koishite Kudasai R (Monthly You, 2016–18) – 6 volumes
 Otonanajimi (Cocohana, 2019–21) – 8 volumes
 Ōkami ni Suzu (Cocohana, 2021–present) – 2 volumes

References

External links
 Aya Nakahara profile at Akata 
 List of works at Shueisha 
 

1973 births
Japanese female comics artists
Female comics writers
Living people
Women manga artists
Manga artists from Osaka Prefecture
Japanese women writers